Neotephritis finalis, the sunflower seed maggot, is a species of fruit fly in the family Tephritidae.

Distribution
Canada, USA and Mexico.

References

Tephritinae
Insects described in 1862
Diptera of North America